Harry Melville Lakin (30 January 1897 – 22 September 1978) was an Australian rules footballer who played with South Melbourne and St Kilda in the Victorian Football League (VFL).

Lakin then played with Camberwell Football Club in 1928.

Notes

External links 

1897 births
1978 deaths
Australian rules footballers from Launceston, Tasmania
Sydney Swans players
St Kilda Football Club players
Camberwell Football Club players
Launceston Football Club players